Clitophon, or the alternate transliteration Cleitophon, may refer to:

Clitophon (Athenian), 5th-century BCE Athenian oligarch
Clitophon (dialogue), a dialogue attributed to Plato
Clitophon of Rhodes, ancient Greek writer to whom the story of Lilaeus is attributed

See also
 Leucippe and Clitophon, by Achilles Tatius, one of the five surviving Ancient Greek romances